General elections were held in South Africa on 6 May 1987. The State of Emergency cast a cloud over the elections, which were again won by the National Party (NP) under the leadership of P. W. Botha, although for the first time it faced serious opposition from the right of the South African political spectrum. The election resulted in the creation of the Second Botha Cabinet, which held power until 1989.

The right-wing opposition came in the form of the Conservative Party (CP), which opposed even the limited powersharing with Indian and Coloured South Africans that had been implemented by the NP as part of a package of constitutional reforms in 1984. The CP was led by a former chairman of the Broederbond and NP cabinet minister, Andries Treurnicht, infamously known as Minister of Education under the Soweto riots. Following the election, in which the CP extended its 17 splinter MPs to win 22 seats, it replaced the Progressive Federal Party (PFP) as the official opposition in the House of Assembly.

The election year also saw important political developments to the left of the NP. During 1987 Denis Worrall resigned as the South African ambassador in London to return to politics. Together with Wynand Malan (who had resigned from the NP) and Esther Lategan he formed the Independent Movement to fight the general election. Only Malan won a seat and the partnership consequently disintegrated. Denis Worrall and others subsequently went on to form the Independent Party (IP), while Esther Lategan and others formed the National Democratic Movement.

Partially as a result of the split in the votes to the liberal anti-NP parties, the PFP lost seven of its parliamentary seats as well as its role of official opposition. The New Republic Party (NRP), formerly the United Party continued its disintegration and lost four of its five seats.

Results
Of the 12 appointed and indirectly elected seats, ten were taken by the National Party and one each by the Conservative Party and Progressive Federal Party.

Reactions
Anglican Archbishop and Nobel Peace Prize winner Desmond Tutu noted after the election, "We have entered the dark ages of the history of our country".

Donald Simpson, writing in the South African newspaper, The Star, went as far as to predict that the National Party would lose the next election and that the Conservative Party would become the new government of South Africa.

References

General elections in South Africa
South Africa
General
Events associated with apartheid
South Africa